Patricio Gonzalo Peralta Espinoza (born 13 August 1985) is a Chilean former footballer. His last club was Lota Schwager.

External links
 
 

1985 births
Living people
Chilean footballers
Primera B de Chile players
Chilean Primera División players
Naval de Talcahuano footballers
Puerto Montt footballers
Coquimbo Unido footballers
C.D. Huachipato footballers
Unión Temuco footballers
Association football defenders
People from Talcahuano